Braided cheese is a dairy product made from strips of highly elastic cheese wound together in a braid. Kurdistan, Turkey, Armenia, Israel, Lebanon, Syria, and many Latin American nations make varieties of braided cheese. These cheeses can be used in a variety of dishes or eaten plain. Some varieties benefit from a soak in cold water, to soften the cheese, and to remove excess salt.

Kurdish Penêrê Honandî, Syrian Akawi, Turkish Örgü peyniri and Latin American Asadero are all examples of braided cheese.

See also
 String cheese
 Chechil
 List of stretch-cured cheeses
 Oaxaca cheese
 Korbácik

References

Stretched-curd cheeses
Turkish cuisine
Turkish cheeses